Mariana Serbezova (born 15 November 1959) is a Bulgarian former rower who competed in the 1980 Summer Olympics.

References

External links
 

1959 births
Living people
Bulgarian female rowers
Olympic rowers of Bulgaria
Rowers at the 1980 Summer Olympics
Olympic bronze medalists for Bulgaria
Olympic medalists in rowing
Medalists at the 1980 Summer Olympics
World Rowing Championships medalists for Bulgaria